Resolving Contradictions is the second solo studio album by English rock musician Andy Mackay, released on Bronze Records in 1978.

Andy Mackay was once Roxy Music's saxophonist, and some members of the group happen to play on this record. This opus is a "concept album" with references to the Chinese culture. The cover, designed by Jane Mackay, figures a sort of post-Cultural Revolution scene. And the sound of most of the numbers relates to what a western world audience could "know" about Chinese music.

Track listing 
All songs are by Andy Mackay; except "Battersea Rise" by Ray Russell and Andy Mackay

"Iron Blossom"
"Trumpets on the Mountains/Off to Work/'Unreal City'"
"The Loyang Tractor Factory"
"Rivers"
"Battersea Rise"
"Skill and Sweat"
"The Ortolan Bunting (A Sparrow's Fall)"
"The Inexorable Sequence"
"A Song of Friendship (The Renmin Hotel)"
"Alloy Blossom (Trumpets in the Suburbs)"
"Green and Gold"

Personnel
Andy Mackay – saxophone, oboe, cor Anglais, piano, synthesizer
Ray Russell – guitar, string and brass arrangements
Mo Foster – bass
Tony Stevens – bass
Paul Thompson – drums, timpani, gong
Peter van Hooke – drums
Phil Manzanera – guitar solo on "The Inexorable Sequence"
Tim Wheater – Chinese reed flute
Chris Parren – keyboards
Gavyn Wright – violin solo
Michael Laird – trumpet

Production and artwork
Phill Brown – assistant producer, engineer
Jane Mackay – assistant producer, cover
Eric Scott – cover painting

References

External links

1978 albums
Concept albums
Bronze Records albums